The  is a high-speed shinkansen service operated between  and  in Japan since 12 March 2011.

This former service was discontinued in 2005 due to revised timetables.

Service pattern
 
 
 *
 
 
 
 *
 *
 *
 
 
 
 
 *
 *
 *
 
 *
 *
 *
 
 

(*) Not served by all trains

Formations

N700 series (8 cars)
Services are formed as shown below with car 1 at the Kagoshima-Chuo end. All cars are no smoking except for smoking compartments in cars 3 and 7. Unusually, reserved ordinary class seats are wider than unreserved seats.

800 series (6 cars)
All cars are no smoking.

History

Limited express service

The Sakura was first introduced on 1 April 1951 as a daytime Limited express service between Tokyo and Osaka. This service was discontinued in October 1958.

The Sakura sleeping car service commenced on 20 July 1959 using 20 series sleeping cars. From March 1972, the train was upgraded with 14 series sleeping cars.

The last services ran on the evening of 28 February 2005.

Shinkansen service

Sakura trains operate once every hour between Shin-Osaka and Kagoshima-Chūō throughout the day. One morning service departs from Kumamoto to Shin-Osaka. Some Sakura runs within the Kyushu Shinkansen are operated by 6-car 800 series trains.

As with the existing Hikari service that operates on the Tokaido & Sanyo Shinkansen lines, the Sakura is the fastest service on the Sanyo & Kyushu Shinkansen lines that can be used with the Japan Rail Pass.

Rolling stock
In the 1990s, the train was formed of up to fourteen 14 series sleeping cars, including two cafeteria cars.

See also
 List of named passenger trains of Japan
 Blue Train (Japan)
 Mizuho - the limited-stop service operating on the same route

References

External links

 JR Kyushu website

Kyushu Railway Company
West Japan Railway Company
Night trains of Japan
Railway services introduced in 1951
Railway services introduced in 2011
Named Shinkansen trains